The Indonesian National Armed Forces (abbreviated as TNI) are the military forces of the Republic of Indonesia. It consists of the Army (TNI-AD), Navy (TNI-AL), and Air Force (TNI-AU). The President of Indonesia is the commander-in-chief of the Armed Forces. In 2021, it comprises approximately 395,500 military personnel including the Indonesian Marine Corps, which is a branch of the Navy.

Initially formed with the name of the People's Security Army (TKR), then later changed to the Republic of Indonesia Army (TRI) before changing again its name to the Indonesian National Armed Forces (TNI) to the present. The Indonesian Armed Forces were formed during the Indonesian National Revolution, when it undertook a guerrilla war along with informal militia. As a result of this, and the need to maintain internal security, the Armed forces including the Army, Navy, and Air Force has been organised along territorial lines, aimed at defeating internal enemies of the state and potential external invaders.

Under the 1945 Constitution, all citizens are legally entitled and obliged to defend the nation. Conscription is provided for by law, yet the Forces have been able to maintain mandated strength levels without resorting to a draft.

History 

Before the formation of the Indonesian Republic, the military authority in the Dutch East Indies was held by the Royal Dutch East Indies Army (KNIL) and naval forces of the Royal Netherlands Navy (KM). Although both the KNIL and KM were not directly responsible for the formation of the future Indonesian armed forces, and mainly took the role of foe during Indonesian National Revolution in 1945 to 1949, the KNIL had also provided military training and infrastructure for some of the future TNI officers and other ranks. There were military training centers, military schools and academies in the Dutch East Indies. Next to Dutch volunteers and European mercenaries, the KNIL also recruited indigenous, especially Ambonese, Kai Islanders, Timorese, and Minahasan people. In 1940, with the Netherlands under German occupation and the Japanese pressing for access to Dutch East Indies oil supplies, the Dutch had opened up the KNIL to large intakes of previously excluded Javanese. Some of the indigenous soldiers that had enjoyed Dutch KNIL military academy education would later become important TNI officers, for example Soeharto and Nasution.

Indonesian nationalism and militarism started to gain momentum and support in World War II during the Japanese occupation of Indonesia. To gain support from the Indonesian people in their war against the Western Allied force, Japan started to encourage and back Indonesian nationalistic movements by providing Indonesian youth with military training and weapons. On 3 October 1943, the Japanese military formed the Indonesian volunteer army called PETA ( – Defenders of the Homeland). The Japanese intended PETA to assist their forces oppose a possible invasion by the Allies. The Japanese military training for Indonesian youth originally was meant to rally the local's support for the Japanese Empire, but later it became the significant resource for the Republic of Indonesia during the Indonesian National Revolution from 1945 to 1949. Many of these men who served in PETA, both officers and NCOs alike like Soedirman, formed the majority of the personnel that would compose the future armed forces.

The Indonesian Armed Forces started out as the People's Security Agency ( – "People's Security Agency"; BKR), which was formed in the third PPKI meeting, on 29 August 1945. BKR united militias across the newly independent country to maintain civil order; it was more of a constabulary than an army. The decision to create a "security agency", and not an army, was taken to avoid the Allied forces seeing it as an armed revolution and invading in full force. One of the terms of surrender to Japan was to return the Asian colonies they had conquered to their previous rulers, certainly not to make them independent.

When confrontations became sharp and hostile between Indonesia and the Allied forces, on 5 October 1945 the People's Security Forces ( – TKR ) was formed on the basis of existing BKR units; this was a move taken to formalize, unite, and organize the splintered pockets of independent troopers across Indonesia, ensuing a more professional military approach, to contend with the Netherlands and the Allied force invaders.

The Indonesian armed forces have seen significant action since their establishment in 1945. Their first conflict was the 1945–1949 Indonesian National Revolution, in which the 1945 Battle of Surabaya was especially important as the baptism of fire of the young armed forces.

In January 1946, TKR renamed as the People's Safety Military Forces (  – TKR), then succeeded by Republic of Indonesia Armed Forces ( – TRI ), in a further step to professionalize the armed forces and increase its ability to engage systematically.

In June 1947, the TRI, per a government decision, was renamed the Indonesian National Armed Forces ( – TNI ) which is a merger between the TRI and the independent paramilitary organizations across Indonesia, becoming by 1950 the APRIS or National Military Forces of the Republic of the United States of Indonesia, by mid year the APRI or Military Forces of the Republic of Indonesia, also absolving native personnel from within both the former KNIL and KM within the expanded republic.

On 21 June 1962, the name "" (TNI) was changed to "" (Republic of Indonesia Armed Forces, ABRI). The POLRI (Indonesian National Police) was integrated under the Armed Forces and changed its name to "Angkatan Kepolisian" (Police Force), and its commander maintained the concurrent status of Minister of Defense and Security, reporting to the President, who is commander in chief. The commanding generals (later chiefs of staff) and the Chief of the National Police then all held ministerial status as members of the cabinet of the republic, while a number of higher-ranking officers were appointed to other cabinet posts. On 1 July 1969, the Police Force's name was reverted to "POLRI".

After the fall of Suharto in 1998, the democratic and civil movement grew against the acute military role and involvements in Indonesian politics. As a result, the post-Soeharto Indonesian military has undergone certain reforms, such as the revocation of the Dwifungsi doctrine and the terminations of military controlled business. The reforms also involved law enforcement in common civil society, which questioned the position of Indonesian police under the military corps umbrella. These reforms led to the separation of the police force from the military. In April 1999, the Indonesian National Police officially regained its independence and now is a separate entity from the armed forces proper. The official name of the Indonesian military also changed from "Angkatan Bersenjata Republik Indonesia" (ABRI) back to "Tentara Nasional Indonesia" (TNI).

Future plans 
At the beginning of 2010, the Indonesian government sought to strengthen the TNI to achieve minimum standards of minimum strength (Minimum Essential Force, or MEF). The MEF was divided into three strategic five-year plan stages, 2010–2014, 2015–2019, and 2020–2024. Initially the government budgeted Rp156 trillion (around US$16 billion at the time) for the provision of TNI's main weapon system equipment (known as alutsista, an abbreviation for Alat Utama Sistem Senjata or "Advanced Weapons System") in the MEF period 2010–2014.

Naming history 
People's Security Agency (Badan Keamanan Rakyat, 22 August – 5 October 1945; spelled "Ra'jat")
People's Security Forces (Tentara Keamanan Rakyat, 5 October 1945 – 7 January 1946; spelled "Ra'jat")
People's Safety Forces (Tentara Keselamatan Rakyat, 7–26 January 1946; spelled "Ra'jat")
Republic of Indonesia Armed Forces (Tentara Republik Indonesia, 26 January 1946 – 3 June 1947; spelled "Repoeblik" until 17 March 1947)
Indonesian National Armed Forces (Tentara Nasional Indonesia, 3 June 1947 – 27 December 1949)
Republic of the United States of Indonesia War Forces (Angkatan Perang Republik Indonesia Serikat, 27 December 1949 – 17 August 1950)
Republic of Indonesia War Forces (Angkatan Perang Republik Indonesia, 17 August 1950 – 21 June 1962)
Republic of Indonesia Armed Forces (Angkatan Bersenjata Republik Indonesia, 21 June 1962 – 1 April 1999; spelled "Bersendjata" until 1 January 1973)*
Indonesian National Armed Forces (Tentara Nasional Indonesia, since 1 April 1999)

*the name TNI was still used during ABRI era when it came to the military itself and the branches excluding the Police (e.g. TNI-AD/AL/AU). But when it was Armed Forces as a whole including the Police the term ABRI was used instead.

Philosophy and doctrine 

The Indonesian military philosophy about the defense of the archipelago is summarily civilian-military defence, called "Total People's Defense", consisting of a three-stage war: a short initial period in which an invader would defeat a conventional Indonesian military, a long period of territorial guerrilla war followed by a final stage of expulsion, with the military acting as a rallying point for defense from grass-roots village level upwards. The doctrine relies on a close bond between villager and soldier to encourage the support of the entire population and enable the military to manage all war-related resources.

The civilian population would provide logistical support, intelligence, and upkeep with some of the population trained to join the guerrilla struggle. The armed forces regularly engage in large-scale community and rural development. The "Armed Forces Enters the Village" (AMD/TMMD) program, begun in 1983, is held three times annually to organize and assist construction and development of civilian village projects.

The current developments in Indonesia's defense policies are framed within the concept of achieving "Minimum Essential Force" or MEF by 2024. This concept of MEF was first articulated in Presidential Decree No. 7/2008 on General Policy Guidelines on State Defense Policy which came into effect on 26 January 2008. MEF is defined as a capability based defense and force level that can guarantee the attainment of immediate strategic defense interests, where the procurement priority is given to the improvement of minimum defense strength and/or the replacement of outdated main weapon systems/equipment. To achieve this aim, MEF had been restructured into a series of 3 strategic programs with timeframes from 2010 to 2014, 2015 to 2019 and 2020 to 2024 as well as spending of up to1.5–2% of the GDP.

The identity of the Indonesian National Armed forces is as defined by the Article 2 of the Law No 34/2004 on Indonesian National Armed forces is the TNI must aim to become the:

 People's Military Forces, the armed forces whose serving personnel come from Indonesian citizens from all walks of life;
 Military of Warriors, which are soldiers who fought to establish the Unitary State of the Republic of Indonesia and do not recognize surrender in carrying out and completing its duties;
 National Armed Forces, the Indonesian national armed forces who serve in the interest of the country and her people over the interests of the regions/provinces, ethnic groups, races, and religions;
 Professional Armed Forces, a military force that is well-trained, well-educated, well-equipped, non-practicable, prohibited to do business and guaranteed welfare, and following the country's political policies that embrace democratic principles, civil supremacy, human rights, the provisions of national law and international laws in force, as ratified and approved in the 1999–2003 amendments to the Constitution.

Organization 

The Indonesian armed forces have long been organized around territorial commands. Following independence, seven were established by 1958. No central reserve formation was formed until 1961 (when the 1st Army Corps of the Army General Reserve, "CADUAD", the precursor of today's Kostrad was established). It was only after the attempted coup d'état of 1 October 1965 and General Suharto's rise to the presidency that it became possible to integrate the armed forces and begin to develop a joint operations structure.

Following a decision in 1985, major reorganization separate the Ministry of Defense and Security from the ABRI (the name of the armed forces used during the New Order) headquarters and staff. MoDS was made responsible for planning, acquisition, and management tasks but had no command or control of troop units. The ABRI Commander in chief retained command and control of all armed forces and continued by tradition to be the senior military officer in the country, while continuing to be a part of the cabinet.

The administrative structure of Ministry of Defense and Security consisted of a minister, deputy minister, secretary general, inspector general, three directorates-general and a number of functional centers and institutes. The minister, deputy minister, inspector general, and three directors general were retired senior military officers; the secretary general (who acted as deputy minister) and most functional center chiefs were, as is the case today, active-duty military officers, while employees and staff were personnel of the armed forces and of the civil service.

The 1985 reorganization also made significant changes in the armed forces chain of command. The four multi-service Regional Defense Commands ("Kowilhans") and the National Strategic Command ("Kostranas") were eliminated from the defense structure, establishing the Military Regional Command ("Kodam"), or area command, as the key organization for strategic, tactical, and territorial operations for all services. The chain of command flowed directly from the "ABRI" commander in chief to the ten "Kodam" commanders, and then to subordinate army territorial commands. The former territorial commands of the air force and navy were eliminated from the structure altogether, with each of those services represented on the "Kodam" staff by a senior liaison officer. The navy and air force territorial commands were replaced by operational commands. The air force formed two Operational Commands ("Ko-Ops") while the navy had its two Fleet Commands, the Western and Eastern Armadas. The air force's National Air Defense Command ("Kohanudnas") remained under the "ABRI" commander in chief. It had an essentially defensive function that included responsibility for the early warning system.

After Suharto's presidential era collapsed in 1998, the Indonesian National Police was separated from the Armed Forces making the Indonesian Armed Forces under the direct auspices command of the Ministry of Defense and the Police Force under the direct auspices of the President of Indonesia. Before 1998, the Armed Forces of Indonesia (the then name "ABRI") was composed of four service branches: Indonesian Army, Indonesian Navy, Indonesian Air Force, and the Indonesian National Police. Then after 1998 (After reformation from Soeharto), the Armed Forces' name, in 1999, was changed to TNI (Tentara Nasional Indonesia) literally meaning: "The National Military of Indonesia" and the independent Indonesian Police Force changed its name to POLRI (Kepolisian Negara Republik Indonesia) literally meaning: "The National Police Force of Indonesia". Now specifically, although the Armed Forces of Indonesia and the National Police of Indonesia has been separated, they still cooperate and conduct special duties and tasks together for the sake of the national security and integrity of Indonesia.

On 13 May 2018, Commander Hadi Tjahjanto reorganized the armed forces once more by inaugurating 4 new military units: Kostrad's 3rd Infantry Division, Navy's 3rd Fleet Command, Air Force's 3rd Air Force Operations Command, and Marine Force III. The new military units are intended to reduce response time against any threats and problems in Eastern Indonesia. He also officially renamed the Western and Eastern Fleet Commands to 1st and 2nd Fleet Commands.

The Indonesian National Armed Forces is structured into the following in accordance with Article 9 of Presidential Regulation No. 66/2019. The organization of the Indonesian National Armed Forces consist of Indonesian National Armed Forces Headquarters based in the Joint Armed Forces Headquarters in Cilangkap, East Jakarta, of which it oversee the headquarters of the three branch of the military:

 Indonesian Army Headquarters, based in Gambir, Central Jakarta;
 Indonesian Navy Headquarters, based in Cilangkap, East Jakarta; and
 Indonesian Air Force Headquarters, also based in Cilangkap, East Jakarta

Armed Forces Headquarters Organization

Leadership elements 

The leadership elements of the Indonesian armed forces consist of the Commander of the Indonesian National Armed Forces and the Deputy Commander of the Indonesian National Armed Forces, both position are held by four-star Generals/Admirals/Air Marshalls appointed by and reporting directly to the President of Indonesia, who is the overall commander-in-chief of the armed forces. As of Nov 2019, the position of deputy commander remains vacant.

 Commander of the Indonesian National Armed Forces; and
 Deputy Commander of the Indonesian National Armed Forces.

Leadership support elements 
 Armed Forces General Staff
 Armed Forces Inspectorate General
 Armed Forces Commander Advisory Staff
 Armed Forces Strategic Policy and General Planning Staff
 Armed Forces Intelligence Staff
 Armed Forces Operations Staff
 Armed Forces Personnel Staff
 Armed Forces Logistics Staff
 Armed Forces Territorial Staff
 Armed Forces Communication and Electronics Staff

Service Elements 
 Armed Forces Psychology Center
 Armed Forces Electronics and Communication Center
 Armed Forces Operations Control Center
 Armed Forces Bureaucratic Reform Center
 Armed Forces General Secretariat
 Armed Forces Headquarters Detachment

Central Executive Agencies 

 Armed Forces Staff and Command Colleges based in Bandung, which consist of:
 Army Staff and Command College, based in Bandung;
 Naval Staff and Command College, based in Cipulir, South Jakarta; and
 Air Force Staff and Command College, based in Lembang, West Bandung.
 Armed Forces Academy, based in Cilangkap, which consist of:
Military Academy, based in Magelang;
Naval Academy, based in Surabaya; and
Air Force Academy, based in Yogyakarta.
 Armed Forces Strategic Intelligence Agency;
 Armed Forces Education, Training and Doctrine Development Command;
 Armed Forces Special Operations Command;
 Indonesian Presidential Security Forces;
 Armed Forces Legal Agency;
 Armed Forces Information Center;
 Armed Forces Medical Center;
 Armed Forces Military Police Center;
 Armed Forces Finance Center ( TNI);
 Armed Forces Peacekeeping Missions Center
 Armed Forces Strategic Assessment, Research, and Development Center;
 Armed Forces Logistics Agency;
 Armed Forces Mental Guidance Center;
 Armed Forces Historical Heritage Center ( TNI);
 Armed Forces Information and Data Processing Center;
 Armed Forces International Cooperation Center;
 Armed Forces Physical Fitness and Basic Military Regulation Center;
 Armed Forces Procurement Center;
 Armed Forces Maritime Information Center;
 Armed Forces Permanent Garrison Commands, which consist of:
 1st Permanent Garrison/Jakarta;
 2nd Permanent Garrison/Bandung;
 3rd Permanent Garrison/Surabaya.
 Armed Forces Cyber Operations Unit.

Principal Operational Commands 
Principal Operation Commands are the centralized TNI forces which are under the command of the Armed Forces General Headquarters. Some of these commands are actually part of the three military branches (such as Kostrad and Koarmada RI, armed and trained by the Army and Navy, respectively), but these are operationally controlled by the Armed Forces General Headquarters.

Defense Territorial Joint Command, tasked with coordinating and integrating operational readiness of all military bases throughout Indonesia. Command held by three-star General/Admiral/Air Marshall. It consists of:
Kogabwilhan I, based in Tanjung Pinang, covering western territories of Indonesia;
Kogabwilhan II, based Penajam Paser, covering central territories of Indonesia; and
Kogabwilhan III, based in Timika, covering eastern territories of Indonesia.
Army Strategic Reserves Command. Command held by three-star General. It consists of:
1st Infantry Division, based in Depok operationally Army expeditionary unit from Banten and West Java;
2nd Infantry Division, based in Malang operationally Army expeditionary unit from Central Java and Eastern Java;
3rd Infantry Division, based in Gowa operationally Army expeditionary unit from South Sulawesi and Central Papua.
Indonesian Fleet Command. Command held by three-star Admiral. It consists of:
Koarmada I, based in Tanjung Uban, operationally western fleet of Indonesia;
Koarmada II, based in Surabaya operationally central fleet of Indonesia; and
Koarmada III, based in Sorong, operationally eastern fleet of Indonesia.
National Air Operations Command. Command held by three-star Air Marshall. It consists of:
Koopsud I, based in Jakarta, operationally western air forces of Indonesia;
Koopsud II, based in Makassar operationally central air forces of Indonesia; and
Koopsud III, based in Biak, operationally eastern air forces of Indonesia.
 Naval Hydro-Oceanographic Center, based in North Jakarta. Command held by three-star Admiral.
Army Military Regional Commands. Command held by two-star General. It consists of fifteen Military Regions (Kodams) territorially covering all 38 Provinces of Indonesia.
Army Special Forces Command. Command held by two-star General. It conducts mainly special operations of Army.
Military Sealift Command. Command held by two-star Admiral. It conduct maritime transportation and logistic transferring.
Indonesian Marine Corps. Command held by two-star Marine General. It consists of:
1st Marine Force, based in South Jakarta;
2nd Marine Force, based in Sidoarjo;
3rd Marine Force, based in Sorong; and
4th Marine Infantry Brigade, based in Lampung.

Branches 
TNI has three service branches, the Army (TNI-AD), the Navy (TNI-AL), and the Air Force (TNI-AU). Each service branch is led by a Chief of Staff (Chief of Staff of the Army, Chief of Staff of the Navy, and Chief of Staff of the Air Force respectively) who is responsible for the administration and capability development for his/her own branch. These positions were previously called Commander or Panglima (for some period in 60s, it is a Minister-equivalent post) which was equipped with commanding authority until it was changed as Chief of Staffs (until now). In the present day, the Commander of The Indonesian National Armed Forces is the only military officer holding commanding authority for all the service branches under the overall authority of the President as Commander in Chief of the Forces.

The TNI-AD (Indonesian Army) was first formed in 1945 following the end of World War II, to protect the newly independent country. It initially consisted of local militia and grew to become the regular army of today. The force now has up to 306,506 personnel, and comprises major strong territorial army commands known as Kodam and several independent regiments, brigades and battalions. The Army is also built up of operational commands and special forces such as the: Kopassus and the Kostrad units also with other types of formation within the Army itself. The Army also operates aircraft under the Army Aviation Command (Pusat Penerbangan Angkatan Darat). The Army operates 123 helicopters including combat, transport, and trainer models, and eight fixed-wing aircraft. The Army also guards and patrols the land borders with Malaysia, Papua New Guinea, and East Timor. 

The TNI-AL (Indonesian Navy) was first formed on 22 August 1945. The current strength of the Navy is around up-to 74,000. In contrast to many other nations and military traditions, the Navy uses Army style ranks (See: Indonesian military ranks). The Navy has one centralized fleet command (Indonesia Fleet Command at Jakarta) which consists of three navy fleets which are the 1st Fleet Command (Koarmada I) based in Jakarta (to be relocated to Tanjung Pinang), the 2nd Fleet Command (Koarmada II) based in Surabaya and the 3rd Fleet Command (Koarmada III) based in Sorong, all three fleet forces commands holding responsibility for the defense of the three maritime and naval territorial commands. The Navy also has a management of aircraft and aviation systems which are operated by the Naval Aviation Command (Pusat Penerbangan Angkatan Laut). The Navy operates 63 fixed wing aircraft and 29 combat and transport helicopters. The Navy also includes the Indonesian Marine Corps (Korps Marinir, or KorMar). It was created on 15 November 1945 and has the duties of being the main naval infantry and amphibious warfare force with quick reaction capabilities and special operations abilities.

The TNI-AU (Indonesian Air Force) is headquartered in Jakarta, Indonesia. Its Order of Battle is under the Air Force Operational Commands (KOOPSAU) which consists of three operational commands (Koopsau I, Koopsau II, and Koopsau III). Most of its airbases are located on the island of Java. Presently, the Air Force has up-to 34,930 personnel equipped with 202 aircraft including Sukhoi Su-27s, Su-30s, F-16 Fighting Falcons, Hawk 100/200s, KAI T-50 Golden Eagles, and EMB 314 Super Tucanos. The Air Force also has air force infantry corps which is known as Kopasgat that are tasked for airbase defense, airborne troops and special forces unit.
While no longer a part of the Armed Forces since 1 April 1999, the Indonesian National Police (POLRI) often operate in paramilitary roles independently or in co-operation with the other services on internal security missions, usually in cooperation with the Indonesian National Armed Forces (TNI). The National Police Mobile Brigade Corps are the main paramilitary forces which are usually put on to these roles and tasks with the service branches of the armed forces. Until today, both the TNI and the POLRI still holds strong ties and cooperation for the sake of the nation's national security and integrity purposes.

Special Forces Unit 
Indonesian Military Special Forces
TNI AD  (Indonesian Army): Kopassus, Tontaipur
TNI AL  (Indonesian Navy): Kopaska, Taifib, Denjaka
TNI AU  (Indonesian Air Force): Kopasgat

In the immediate aftermath of 2018 Surabaya bombings, President Widodo has agreed to revive the TNI Joint Special Operations Command (Koopsusgab) to assist the National Police in antiterrorism operations under certain conditions. This joint force is composed of special forces of the National Armed Forces as mentioned above, and is under the direct control of the Commander of the National Armed Forces. In July 2019, President Widodo officially formed the Armed Forces Special Operations Command  (Koopsus TNI) which comprised 400 personnel each from Sat-81 Gultor of Kopassus, Denjaka, and Den Bravo of Kopasgat to conduct special operations to protect national interests within or outside Indonesian territory.

Equipment 

TNI AD  List of Equipment of the Indonesian Army
TNI AL  List of Equipment of the Indonesian Navy
TNI AU  List of Equipment of the Indonesian Air Force

Reserves 
The Indonesian National Armed Forces Reserve Component (Komponen Cadangan TNI, abbreviated into KOMCAD) is the military reserve force element of the Indonesian National Armed Forces.

On January 12, 2021, President Joko Widodo, as Commander in Chief of the Armed Forces, issued Government Regulation Number 3 of 2021 implementing Law 23 on the Management of National Resources for Defense of the Nation which established the Reserve as a directly reporting unit under the General Headquarters, in order to supplement the Principal Component, i.e. the Armed Forces and the National Police.

Under the regulation, the Reserve shall consists of land, sea, and air reserve force. The membership is voluntary for all citizens, even for members of the civil service.

Budget 

*The 2020 budget was changed due to COVID-19 outbreak, while the budget for the Ministry of Health, and Ministry of Education and Culture has been increased.

Commander

Uniforms 

The Indonesian National Armed Forces have three types of uniforms worn by its personnel, which are general service uniforms, specialized service uniforms and branch-specific uniforms.

General service uniforms have three subtypes of uniform, which are Dress uniform ( / PDU), Service uniform ( / PDH) and Field Uniform ( / PDL). Each uniform subtypes also consists of several categories, which are:

Each branches of the national armed forces have different color in their general service uniforms. 
 Dress uniform ( / PDU)
 Army: Dark green coat, Dark green trousers
 Navy: White suit.
 Air Force: Dark blue coat, Dark blue trousers.
 Service uniform ( / PDH)
 Army: green shirt, with dark green trousers
 Navy: greyish blue shirt, with dark greyish trousers. For international event/duty, the navy personnel will wear white shirt with white trousers.
 Air Force: light blue shirt, dark blue trousers
 Field uniform ( / PDL)
 All branches: DPM camouflage, sometimes called as "".

Specialized service uniform consists of: 

 Pregnant-women service uniform (PDSH)
 Standard-bearer service uniform (Gampokbang)
 Military parade service uniform (PDP)
 State visit service uniform (Gamprot)
 Provost service uniform (Gamprov)
 Military police service uniform (Gam Pom)
 Military band service uniform (Gamsik)
 Presidential security force service uniform (Gam Paspampres)
 Desert field uniform

Branch-specific uniforms consists of:

On 2 March 2022, the Army unveiled their field uniform with new camo pattern, called as "" (Army camo pattern), that is specific only to the Army. This camo is a variant of Multicam based on US Army OCP with local DPM color palette. A Desert/Arid variant intended to replace the older local Desert DPM Variant are also Present.

Personnel 
The Indonesian armed forces are voluntary. The active military strength is 400,000 with 400,000 reserves with available manpower fit for military service of males aged between 16 and 49 is 75,000,000, with a further 4,500,000 new suitable for service annually.

Rank structures 

In the Indonesian Army, Navy (including Marine Corps), Air Force, and the Police Force, the rank consists of officer known as in Indonesian: "Perwira", NCO: "Bintara" and enlisted: "Tamtama". The rank titles of the Marine Corps are the same as those of the Army, but it still uses the Navy's style insignia (for lower-ranking enlisted men, blue are replacing the red colour).

Armed Forces Pledge (Sapta Marga) 
The Armed Forces Pledge is a pledge of loyalty and fidelity of the military personnel to the government and people of Indonesia and to the principles of nationhood.

See also 

 Foreign relations of Indonesia
 March of the Indonesian National Armed Forces
 List of aircraft of the Indonesian National Armed Forces
 Indonesian Maritime Security Agency
 Indonesian Sea and Coast Guard

Notes

References

Further reading 

Bresnan, John. (1993). Managing Indonesia: the modern political economy. New York: Columbia University Press.
Many topics, including the political role of the military at the height of Suharto's New Order.
Chandra, Siddharth and Douglas Kammen. (2002). "Generating Reforms and Reforming Generations: Military Politics in Indonesia's Transition to Democracy." World Politics, Vol. 55, No. 1.
Crouch, Harold. (1988). The army and politics in Indonesia. Ithaca:Cornell University Press.
First published 1978. Now somewhat dated, but provides an influential overview of the role of the military in consolidating Suharto's power
"Guerilla Warfare and the Indonesian Strategic Psyche" Small Wars Journal article by Emmet McElhatton 
Israel, Fauzi.(2009) – Advanced Weapon's Infantry Firepower & Accuracy
Kammen, Douglas and Siddharth Chandra. (1999). A Tour of Duty: Changing Patterns of Military Politics in Indonesia in the 1990s. Ithaca, New York: Cornell Modern Indonesia Project No. 75.
 Kingsbury, Damen. Power Politics and the Indonesian Military, Routledge: 2003

External links 
 Official Website of TNI
 Official Website of the Department of Defence
 Civil-Military Relations in Post-Suharto Indonesia and the Implications for Democracy Today: A Preliminary Analysis
 Indonesia Military Guide
 Indonesia's Army (TNI-AD)
 Indonesia's Navy (TNI-AL)
 Indonesia's Air Force (TNI-AU)

Military of Indonesia
Military history of Indonesia
I
1945 establishments in Indonesia